Shahida is a Pakistani Urdu film released on 19 March 1949. The film was directed by Luqman. Shahida was actually the first Pakistani film which was started before the independence of Pakistan in 1947 and later released in 1949.

Shamim Bano played the title role in the film opposite Nasir Khan, who appeared in the leading role in his second and final Lollywood film, after which he left the Pakistan and went to India permanently.

This film was originally started as a project by Hakim Ahmad Shuja, along with financial backers in pre-independence  British India (circa 1945-46) but could not be filmed due to various problems, in particular the independence of India and Pakistan in 1947, which also led to the end of the old, joint film industry and its mutual contacts. The project was revived in 1948, by M. Akbar, as producer and Luqman as director. Hakim Ahmad Shuja was asked to revise his original script and to help write out the song lyrics, of classics such as "Dar Ba Dar Phirte Hain" and "Alwidah", with  Ghulam Haider and Ghulam Ahmed Chishti giving the music.

Cast 

 Shamim Bano as Shahida
 Nasir Khan as Saeed
 Shakir as Kabeer
 G.N. Butt as Ameer Hassan
 Hamaliyawala
 Begum Parveen

References

Notes

External links
 

Pakistani drama films
1940s Urdu-language films
1949 films
Pakistani black-and-white films
Films scored by Ghulam Haider
Films scored by Ghulam Ahmed Chishti
Urdu-language Pakistani films